Gilbert Montagné (born 28 December 1951) is a French singer, musician, pianist and organist from the Ménilmontant neighbourhood of Paris and Bourbonnais historical region of central France. Blind since shortly after birth, he is best remembered for his international hit "The Fool" which was a number 1 single across Europe and South America in 1971, as well as his songs "On va s'aimer" (1983) and "Les Sunlights des tropiques" (1984). In France, he is still a popular albums and concert artist, having toured and sung with the likes of Johnny Hallyday and Kool & the Gang.

In 2009, he participated in the television show Rendez-vous en terre inconnue in Zanskar. He was made a Knight of the Order of Arts and Letters in 1982, an Officer in the National Order of Merit in 2011 and an Officer in the Order of the Legion of Honour in 2020.

Montagné was active in politics within the Union for a Popular Movement under the presidency of Nicolas Sarkozy. In the 2010 regional election, he ran as a candidate in Allier. Montagné is also noted for his activism for blind people. From ages 10 to 16, he was a student at the Institut National des Jeunes Aveugles in Paris. In 2022, Saint-Léon, the village his father was originally from and Gilbert Montagné visited as a child, named a square after him.

Discography

Albums
Gilbert Montagné (1971)
Il faut que ça swing (1976)
Ta vie (1981)
Liberté (1984)
Gilbert Montagné à l'Olympia LIVE (1985)
Quelques notes de musiques (1985)
Vivre en couleurs (1987)
Entre douceur et violence (1989)
En accord magique (1989)
Rien qu'une amitié (1993)
Comme une étoile (1995)
Le meilleur compilation (1995)
Mélange de couleurs (1997)
Les plus belles chansons compilation (1997)
Live à l'Olympia (1998)
CD Story compilation (2001)
Anthologie 3-CD box set (2001)
Les indispensables compilation (2001)
Rien sans ton amour (2002)
Versions Originales compilation (2002)
Ses plus belles chansons compilation (2002)
Best of Gilbert Montagné compilation (2002)
Get Ready (2006)

Singles
"Quand on ferme les yeux"/"Le phénomène" (1969)
"The Morning Comes" (1970)
"The Fool"/"Hide Away" (1971)
"Aime-moi"/"Song for Every Time" (1972)
"Baby I Feel so Fine"/"My Lord" (1972)
"Dans mon piano il y a des oiseaux"/"Elle chantait ma vie en musique" (1973)
"M'laisse pas tomber" (1979)
"Believe in Me"/"On the Road" (1979)
"Besoin de vous" (1981)
"On va s'aimer" (1983)
"Just For Tonight" (1984)
"Liberté" (1984)
"Les sunlights des tropiques"/"Près de toi" (1984)
"J'ai le blues de toi"/"Si je l'aime" (1984)
"Au soleil – Robinson Crusoé"/"Un monde entre nous" (1984)
"Je veux tout"/"Sans elle" (1987)
"Perdu dans New-York" (1989)
"Plus fort la vie"/"Open Your Heart (and Take a Chance)" (1990)
"Un vrai Noël" (2001)
"Entendre ton sourire"/"Si tu voulais" (2002)

References

External links
Official website (in French)
Full discography

1951 births
Blind musicians
French male singers
French pop singers
20th-century French male pianists
21st-century French male pianists
Living people
Musicians from Paris
Officers of the Ordre national du Mérite
French blind people